The 2016 FIBA U18 Women's European Championship was an international basketball competition held in Sopron, Hungary, from 23 to 31 July 2016. It was the 33rd edition of the championship, and the FIBA Europe qualifying tournament for the 2017 FIBA Under-19 Women's Basketball World Cup. 16 national teams from across Europe, composed of women aged 18 and under, competed in the tournament.

Venues 
 Novomatic Aréna I, Sopron
 Novomatic Aréna II, Sopron

Participating teams 
  (hosts)
 
 
 
 
 
 
   (Runners-up, 2015 FIBA Europe Under-18 Championship for Women Division B)
  
 
 
 
   (Winners, 2015 FIBA Europe Under-18 Championship for Women Division B)
 
 
   (Third place, 2015 FIBA Europe Under-18 Championship for Women Division B)

First round
The first-round groups draw took place on 22 January 2016 in Munich, Germany. 

All times are local – Central European Summer Time (UTC+2).

Group A

Group B

Group C

Group D

Knockout stage

Bracket

Classification playoffs

5th–8th place bracket

9th–16th place bracket
 Loser of the 13th place game will also be relegated to the 2017 FIBA Europe Under-18 Championship Division B. 
 Participants of the 15th place game will be relegated to Euro U-18 Division B. 

All times are local (UTC+2).

Round of 16

9th–16th place quarterfinals

Quarterfinals

13th–16th place semifinals

9th–12th place semifinals

5th–8th place semifinals

Semifinals

Final classification games

Match for 15th place

Match for 13th place

Match for 11th place

Match for 9th place

Match for 7th place

Match for 5th place

Bronze medal match

Final

Awards

All-Tournament Team 
PG-  Reka Lelik
SG-  Naira Caceres
SF-  Alexia Chartereau
PF-  Digna Strautmane
C-  Raisa Musina

Final standings

References

External links
FIBA official website

2016
2016–17 in European women's basketball
2016–17 in Hungarian basketball
International youth basketball competitions hosted by Hungary
International women's basketball competitions hosted by Hungary
Sport in Sopron
2016 in youth sport
July 2016 sports events in Europe